A tongue frenulum piercing, tongue web piercing, or lingual frenulum piercing is a body piercing through the frenulum underneath the tongue (frenulum linguae).  These piercings do have a tendency to migrate over time. Depending on the anatomy of the individual, this piercing may not be feasible.

Jewelry
Both ring and curved barbell style jewelry can be worn in these piercings.

See also
 Lip piercing
 Tongue piercing

References

External links
 Body Modification E-zine entry on tongue web piercings 
 Body Modification E-zine entry on sublingual damage 
 Body Piercing Blog On Tongue Web Piercing

Body piercing
Facial piercings
Tongue